Launggyet is a former capital of the Launggyet Dynasty of Arakan from 1237/1251 to 1430. It is also last capital of Laymro Kingdom. The former capital site is located a few miles northwest of Mrauk U, Rakhine State, Myanmar. The Arakanese chronicle Rakhine Razawin Thit gives the foundation date as 22 April 1251. Some Arakanese chronicles give the foundation date as 1237 CE.

History 

Following the death of King Nganalon, his son Prince Alawmaphyu succeeded him in 1250. He reign for 1 year at the capital of Nyeinzara Toungoo. Newly king realized that it was time for foundation of new city.

References

Bibliography
 
 

Former populated places in Asia
Launggyet dynasty
History of Rakhine
1237 establishments in Asia
13th century in Burma
14th century in Burma